The British Academy Video Games Award for Performer in a Leading Role is an award presented annually by the British Academy of Film and Television Arts (BAFTA) in honor of the best leading performance featured in a game "from voice artistry through to motion capture".

BAFTA has honoured video game performances since the 8th British Academy Video Games Awards ceremony in 2012, with Mark Hamill winning the inaugural award for his performance as the Joker in Batman: Arkham City. From 2012 to 2019, performers in both leading and supporting roles were considered together in the merged category of British Academy Games Award for Performer but, as of the 16th British Academy Games Awards, during a reconfiguration of categories, BAFTA announced that the Performer award would be split into both Leading and Supporting categories.

The inaugural winner in the Leading category was Gonzalo Martin for his role as Sean Diaz in Dontnod Entertainment's Life Is Strange 2. Laura Bailey has received the most nominations with two, one for her role as Kait Diaz in Gears 5 and one for her portrayal of Abby in The Last of Us Part II, which she won.

The current holder of the award is Jane Perry for her role as Selene Vassos in Returnal which won at the 18th British Academy Games Awards in 2022.

Winners and nominees

In the following table, the years are listed as per BAFTA convention, and generally correspond to the year of game release in the United Kingdom.

Multiple wins and nominations

Performers
2 nominations
Laura Bailey

Series
2 nominations
Call of Duty
Call of Duty: Modern Warfare (1 nomination)
Call of Duty: Modern Warfare II (1 nomination)
Deathloop
God of War Ragnarök
Life Is Strange
Life Is Strange 2 (1 nomination)
Life Is Strange: True Colors (1 nomination)
The Last of Us Part II

References

External links
British Academy Video Games Awards official website

Performer
Awards for video game performances